Zoabi  is a surname. Notable people with the surname include:

 Abdel Rahman Zuabi, last name also spelled Zoabi, Arab Israeli judge
 Ghaida Rinawie Zoabi, Arab Israeli activist and politician
 Haneen Zoabi, Arab Israeli politician
 Omran al-Zoubi, last name also spelled Zoabi, Syrian politician
 Sameh Zoabi, Palestinian film writer